Victor Hugo Matta (born 21 April 1990 in Asunción, Paraguay) is a Paraguayan football midfielder.

Career

Olimpia Asunción
Matta emerged through Olimpia Asunción's youth system. Whilst at the Olimpia Asunción reserve team, Matta was coached by Mauro Caballero, who took him to the first squad. In 2011, Matta was in Olimpia Asunción's championship winning team. Matta appeared on the bench in both of Olimpia Asunción's 2012 Copa Sudamericana home and away games against Uruguayan team Danubio in July and August. In February 2013, Matta was added to Olimpia Asunción's first team, as were Alberto Contrera, Argentine Emanuel Biancucchi, Miguel Angel Montorfaro and Colombian Yair Ibarguen. In September 2013, Matta was joined by his brother, Marcelo, in the Olimpia Asunción first squad.

General Díaz
On 27 August 2014, Matta appeared on the bench for General Díaz in a 2–2 away draw against Chile team Cobresal in the Copa Sudamericana. On 2 April 2016, Matta played in his last Primera División Paraguaya game for General Díaz in a 7–3 home defeat against Deportivo Capiatá, appearing in the roster's starting line-up.

General Caballero ZC
Following General Caballero ZC, Matta left football for close to one year and a half.

Tacuary
At Tacuary, Matta achieved two consecuituve ascensions.

Style of play
Matta plays as a mixed winger, on the left and right.

Personal life
Matta's idol is former Barcelona footballer Xavi Hernandez.

Education
Before and following the 2020 COVID-19 Pandemic, Matta studied architecture at the Universidad Americana. Matta studied accounting for two years, and whilst in the 2020 COVID-19 Pandemic, Matta worked as an assistant accountant to his father.

References

External links
 
 
 
 Victor Matta at Playmakerstats.com

Paraguayan footballers
Association football midfielders
1990 births
Living people